As Latin developed into Proto-Romance it experienced numerous sound changes, a rough summary of which is provided below.

General changes 
 /h/ is lost without a trace in all positions (elision).
If this results in a collision of identical short vowels, they simply form the corresponding long vowel. Cf. /koˈhorte/ > /ˈkoːrte/.

 Final /m/ is lost in polysyllabic words (elision, apocope). Cf. /ˈnunkʷam/ > /ˈnunkʷa/.
In monosyllables it tends to survive as /n/ (alveolarization). Cf. /ˈkʷem/ > /ˈkʷen/ > Spanish quién.

Clusters consisting of a stop followed by a liquid consonant draw the stress position forward. Cf. /ˈinteɡram/ > /inˈteɡra/. 
Two apparent counterexamples are /ˈpalpebraːs/ and /ˈpullitra/, judging by the Old French outcomes palpres and poltre.
/n/ is lost before fricatives (elision, syncope), resulting in compensatory lengthening of the preceding vowel. Cf. /ˈsponsa/ > /ˈspoːsa/. 
/n/ was often retained, or restored, if it belonged to a prefix (in- or con-) or to a word which had forms where a fricative did not follow /n/. Cf. /deːˈfensa/ > French défense, thanks to related forms such as the infinitive /deːˈfendere/ > French défendre.
Sequences of two /i(ː)/ generally merge to a single long /iː/ (coalescence/fusion, elision, syncope). Cf. /au̯ˈdiiː, konˈsiliiː/ > /au̯ˈdiː, koːˈsiliː/.

 In some outlying rural areas, the diphthongs /ae̯/ and /au̯/ reduce to /eː/ and /oː/ respectively in Classical times (monophthongization). Thanks to influence from such dialects, a number of Latin words acquire monophthongized variants early on; cf. /ˈfae̯ks~ˈfeːks/ or /ˈkau̯lis~ˈkoːlis/. Most words, however, remain unaffected by this.
Later, 'mainstream' Latin experiences a general monophthongization of /ae̯/ to /ɛː/, and of /oe̯/ to /eː/, while /au̯/ remains intact in most cases. Cf. /'lae̯ta, 'poe̯na, 'au̯rum/ >/'lɛːta, 'peːna, 'au̯ru/.
Short vowels (other than /a/) become increasingly lax and lowered, with /i e o u/ trending towards [ɪ ɛ ɔ ʊ].
/w/ turns to the fricative /β/, as does original /b/ in intervocalic position or before /r/. Cf. /ˈwiːwere, ˈtrabem/ > /ˈβiːβere, ˈtraβe/.
 Intervocalic /β/ in contact with a rounded vowel tends to disappear (elision, syncope). Cf. /ˈriːwus/ > /ˈriːβus/ > /ˈriːus/.
It is often restored if other forms of the word have a non-rounded vowel following /β/. In this case cf. the nominative plural /ˈriːβiː/.
In hiatus, unstressed front vowels became /j/, while unstressed back vowels became /w/. Cf. /ˈfiːlius, ˈsapuiː/ > /ˈfiːljus, ˈsapwiː/.
The same process also affected stressed front and back vowels in hiatus if they were antepenultimate (two syllables from the end of the word). When /j/ was produced, primary stress shifted to the following vowel, but when /w/ was produced, primary stress shifted instead to the preceding syllable. Cf. /fiːˈliolus, teˈnueram/ > /fiːˈljolus, ˈtenwera/. 
If /w/ was formed after a geminate consonant, it was subsequently deleted. Cf. /batˈtuere/ > /ˈbattwere/ > /ˈbattere/. 
/w/ was deleted before unstressed back vowels. Cf. /ˈkarduus, ˈunɡuoː/ > /ˈkardwus, ˈunɡwoː/ > /ˈkardus, ˈunɡoː/.
/w/ was occasionally deleted before unstressed non-back vowels as well. Cf. /februˈaːrius/ > /feˈβrwaːrjus/ > /feˈβraːrjus/. 
Similarly, /kʷ/ was delabialized to /k/ before back vowels, whether stressed or not. Cf. /ˈkʷoːmodo, ˈkokʷoː/ > /ˈkoːmodo, ˈkokoː/.
If these changes result in sequences of /je(ː)/ or /wo(ː)/, these merge to /eː/ and /oː/ respectively (monophthongization, syncope, elision). Cf. /paˈrieteːs, duˈodekim/ > /paˈrjeteːs, ˈdwodeki/ > /paˈreːteːs, ˈdoːdeki/. 
If /j/ forms after /kʷ/, the resulting /kʷj/ simplifies and delabializes to /kj/. Cf. /ˈlakʷeum/ > /ˈlakʷju/ > /ˈlakju/. 
Word-internal /j/ 'merges' into a preceding consonant, palatalizing it. Cf. /ˈkaːseum/ > /ˈkaːsju/ > /ˈkaːsʲu/ > Italian /ˈkatʃo/.
 /tʲ kʲ nʲ lʲ/ probably develop to [tsʲ c ɲ ʎ] respectively.
 [c ɲ ʎ] regularly geminate in intervocalic position. [tsʲ] does so as well, but sporadically.
Intervocalic /ɡʲ/ and /dʲ/ merge with /j/. Cf. /ˈfaːɡea, ˈradium/ > /ˈfaːɡʲa, ˈradʲu/ > /ˈfaːja, ˈraju/ > Spanish haya, rayo. A counterexample is Romanian  from Vulgar Latin .
Intervocalic /βʲ/ occasionally merges with /j/. Cf. /kaˈweola, / > /kaˈβʲola/ > /kaˈjola/ > Old French jaiole.
After /r/ and /n/, /dʲ/ variably yields [ɟ] or [dzʲ]. Cf. /ˈhordeum/ > /ˈordʲu/ > French orge, Italian orzo.
The sequence /ndʲ/ sometimes assimilates to [ɲɲ]. Cf. /wereːˈkundia/ > /βereːˈkundʲa/ > Portuguese vergonha, Italian vergogna (but compare Spanish vergüenza, Old Portuguese vergonça).

Initial and intervocalic /j/ undergo fortition, perhaps to [ɟ] in the former case and [ɟ] or [ʝ~ɟɟ] in the latter.
/u/ raises before /i(ː)/ or /j/. Cf. [ˈkʊi̯, ˈfʊiː] > [ˈkui̯ ˈfuiː]> Italian cui, fui (not *coi, *foi).
/ɡ/ before /n/ apparently spirantizes to [ɣ], with subsequent developments varying by region.
/ɡ/ before /m/ vocalizes to /u̯/. Cf. /fraɡˈmenta, ˈsaɡma/ > /frau̯ˈmenta, ˈsau̯ma/.

Before or after a consonant, and also word-finally, /ks/ reduces to /s/. Cf. /ˈkalks, ˈsekstus/ > /ˈkals, ˈsestus/.
Intervocalically, it sometimes metathesizes to /sk/. Cf. /ˈwiːksit/ > /ˈβiːskit/.
Words beginning with /sC/ receive an initial supporting vowel [ɪ], unless preceded by a word ending in a vowel. Cf. [ˈskɔla] > [ɪsˈkɔla].
Subsequently, any original /e/ or /ɪ/ before an /sC/ cluster is reinterpreted as a supporting vowel and treated accordingly. Cf. /ˈskala, eksˈkadere/ > *[ɪsˈkala, ɪskaˈdere] > Italian scala, scadere; French échelle, échoir.

 /eː/ and /oː/ before /stʲ/ are raised, respectively, to /iː/ and /uː/. Cf. /ˈbeːstia, ˈoːstium/ > /ˈbiːstʲa, ˈuːstʲa/ > Italian biscia, uscio.
 Compound verbs stressed on a prefix are usually reconstructed according to their prefixless equivalent, with stress moved accordingly. Cf. /ˈdispliket/ > */disˈplaket/, by analogy with the simplex form /ˈplaket/.
/ˈrekipit/ simply yields /reˈkipit/ (rather than */reˈkapit/), perhaps because the verb, while recognizable as a compound, was not easy to identify with the original capere.
Some words such as /ˈkolliɡoː/ 'fasten' were apparently not recognized as compounds at all and so remained unchanged.
Monosyllabic nouns ending in a consonant receive an epenthetic final /e/. Cf. /ˈrem/ > /ˈren/ > /ˈrene/ > French rien.

Phonemic vowel length gradually collapses via the following changes (which only affect vowel length, not quality): 
Long vowels shorten in unstressed syllables.
Long vowels shorten in stressed closed syllables.
Short vowels lengthen in stressed open syllables.
On account of the above, the vowel inventory changes from /iː i eː e a aː o oː u uː/ to /i ɪ e ɛ a ɔ o ʊ u/, with pre-existing differences in vowel quality achieving phonemic status (and with no distinction between original /a/ and /aː/). Additionally:
Unstressed /ɛ/ and /ɔ/ merge with /e/ and /o/ respectively.
In unstressed word-internal position, /i/ and /u/ merge with /ɪ/ and /ʊ/ respectively.
Lengthened /ˈɛ/ and /ˈɔ/ perhaps already yield the incipient diphthongs [eɛ, oɔ] if followed by a syllable with a close vowel (/i/ or /u/) (raising).

Sporadic changes 
 Vowels other than /a/ are often syncopated in unstressed word-internal syllables, especially when in contact with liquid consonants or, to a lesser extent, nasal consonants or /s/. Cf. /ˈanɡulus, ˈkalida, ˈspekulum/ > /ˈanɡlʊs, ˈkalda, ˈspɛklu/.
In a few words, unstressed initial syllables followed by /r/ experience syncope. Cf. /kʷiriːˈtaːre, diːˈreːktus/ > /kriˈtare, ˈdrektʊs/.
If this results in /β/ being followed by a consonant, it may vocalize to /u̯/. Cf. /ˈfabula/ > /ˈfaβla/ > */ˈfau̯la/ > Italian fòla.
If syncope results in /tl/, the cluster is generally replaced by /kl/. Cf. /ˈwetulus/ > /ˈβɛklʊs/.
In cases where a long vowel precedes a geminate consonant, one of the elements often shortens unpredictably, sometimes leading to such doublets as /ˈkuppa~ˈkuːpa/ > /ˈkʊppa~ˈkupa/ > Spanish copa and cuba, French coupe and cuve.
 Long vowels sometimes shorten early on in closed syllables, even if followed by two different consonants, leading to variations such as /ˈuːndekim~ˈundekim/ > /ˈundekɪ~ˈʊndekɪ/ > Italian undici, Spanish onze.
Conversely, the cluster [ŋk] may lengthen preceding vowels early on. Cf. [ˈkʷɪŋkʷɛ] > [ˈkʷiːŋkʷɛ] > [ˈkiŋkʷe].

 Pretonic vowels sporadically assimilate to, or dissimilate from, the stressed vowel of the following syllable.
/a/ can dissimilate to /o/ before a following /a/. Cf. /naˈtaːre/ > /noˈtare/.
/iː/ can dissimilate to /e/ before a following /iː/. Cf. /diːˈwiːnus, wiːˈkiːnus/ > /deˈβinʊs, βeˈkinʊs/.
/au̯/ can dissimilate to /a/ before a following /u(ː)/. Cf. /au̯ˈɡustus, au̯skulˈtaːre/ > /aˈɡʊstʊs, askʊlˈtare/.
/o/ can dissimilate to /e/ before a following back vowel. Cf. /roˈtundus, soˈroːre/ > /reˈtʊndʊs, seˈrore/.
/i/ can assimilate to a following /a(ː)/. Cf. /silˈwaːtikus/ > /salˈβatɪkʊs/.
/eː/ can assimilate to a following /oː/. Cf. */reːniˈoːne/ > */roˈnʲone/.
/iː/ can assimilate to a following /eː/. Cf. /diːˈreːktus/ > */deˈrektʊs/.

/oː/ and /u/ may yield a low-mid vowel if followed by /β/. Cf. /ˈoːwum, ˈkolubra/ > /ˈɔβu, koˈlɔβra/ > Italian uovo, Sardinian colòra.

 /a/ may yield a mid-vowel if preceded by /j/. Cf. /jakˈtaːre/ > */jekˈtare/.

 /r/ assimilates to a following /s/ in a number of cases. Cf. /ˈdorsum/ > /ˈdɔssu/.
After a long vowel, the resulting /ss/ reduces to /s/. Cf. /ˈsuːrsum/ > /ˈsusu/.
Initial /kr/ and /kV/ sometimes voice. Cf. /ˈkrassus/ > /ˈɡrassʊs/.
This is particularly frequent with borrowings from Greek. Cf. κρυπτή, καμπή > */ˈɡrʊpta, ˈɡamba/ > Italian grotta, gamba.

 /nd/ sometimes assimilates to /nn/. Cf. the alternation grundire~grunnire.

 There is occasional loss or assimilation of final /s/, but it is nowhere regular until a much later period.

 When two neighbouring syllables each contain /r/, one /r/ frequently dissimilates to /l/ or is deleted.

See also 
 Appendix Probi
 Reichenau Glossary
 Proto-Romance language
 Lexical changes from Classical Latin to Proto-Romance

Notes

References

Bibliography 
Adams, James Noel. 2007. The regional diversification of Latin. Cambridge University Press.
Adams, James Noel. 2013. Social variation and the Latin language. Cambridge University Press.
Allen, William Sidney. 1965. Vox Latina: A guide to the pronunciation of Classical Latin. Cambridge University Press.
Chambon, Jean-Pierre. 2013. Notes sur un problème de la reconstruction phonétique et phonologique du protoroman: Le groupe */ɡn/. Bulletin de la Société de linguistique de Paris. CVIII, 273–282.
Elcock, William Dennis. 1960. The Romance languages. London: Faber and Faber.
Ferguson, Thaddeus. 1976. A history of the Romance vowel systems through paradigmatic reconstruction. Berlin: De Gruyter.
Gouvert, Xavier. 2015. Reconstruction phonologique. In Buchi, Éva & Schweickard, Wolfgang (eds.), Dictionnaire étymologique roman 1, 61–128. Berlin: De Gruyter
Gouvert, Xavier. 2016. Du protoitalique au protoroman: Deux problèmes de reconstruction phonologique. In Buchi, Éva & Schweickard, Wolfgang (eds.), Dictionnaire étymologique roman 2, 27–51. Berlin: De Gruyter.
Grandgent, Charles Hall. 1907. An introduction to Vulgar Latin. Boston: D.C. Heath & Co.
Hall, Robert Anderson. 1976. Proto-Romance phonology. New York: Elsevier.
Jensen, Frede. 1972. From Vulgar Latin to Old Provençal. Chapel Hill: University of North Carolina Press.
Lausberg, Heinrich. 1970. Lingüística románica, I: Fonética. Madrid: Gredos.
Leppänen, V. & Alho, T. 2018. On the mergers of Latin close-mid vowels. Transactions of the Philological Society 116. 460–483.
Lloyd, Paul M. 1987. From Latin to Spanish. Philadelphia: American Philosophical Society.
Loporcaro, Michele. 2011. Phonological processes. In Maiden, Maiden & Smith, John Charles & Ledgeway, Adam (eds.), The Cambridge history of the Romance languages, vol. 1, 109–154. Cambridge University Press.
Loporcaro, Michele. 2015. Vowel length from Latin to Romance. Oxford University Press.
Maiden, Martin. 2016. Diphthongization. In Ledgeway, Adam & Maiden, Martin (eds.), The Oxford guide to the Romance languages, 647–57. Oxford University Press.
Penny, Ralph. 2002. A history of the Spanish language. Cambridge University Press.
Politzer, Robert L. 1953. Romance trends in 7th and 8th century Latin documents. Chapel hill: University of North Carolina Press.
Pope, Mildred K. 1934. From Latin to French. Manchester University Press.
Wilkinson, Hugh E. 1976. Notes on the development of -kj-, -tj- in Spanish and Portuguese. Ronshu 17. 19–36.
Zampaulo, André. 2019. Palatal sound change in the Romance languages. Oxford University Press.

Latin language
Sound laws
Italic phonologies
Romance languages